Anderson Avenue may refer to:

Anderson Avenue (Hudson Palisades), north–south avenue which is the major commercial district for Fairview, Cliffside Park, and Fort Lee in New Jersey
Anderson Avenue (SEPTA Route 101 station), stop along the SEPTA Media (Route 101) trolley line in the Aronimink section of Drexel Hill, Pennsylvania
Anderson–Jerome Avenues (IRT Ninth Avenue Line), station on the abandoned section of the IRT Ninth Avenue Line in NYC